Purplebeck, sometimes written as Purple Beck, is a South Korean girl group formed by Majesty Entertainment. They made their debut on June 24, 2019, with the extended play, Crystal Ball. The group currently consists of four members: Yeowool, Yerim, Mini, and Seyeon. Layeon left the group in July of 2021.

Discography

Extended plays

Single albums

Members

Current
 Yeowool (여울)
 Yerim (예림)
 Mini (민이)
 Seyeon (세연)

Former
 Layeon (라연)

References

K-pop music groups
South Korean girl groups
South Korean dance music groups
Musical groups from Seoul
Musical groups established in 2019
2019 establishments in South Korea
South Korean pop music groups